Micropsephodes lundgreni is a species of beetle in the family Anamorphidae. It is found in North America.

References

Further reading

 
 

Coccinelloidea
Articles created by Qbugbot
Beetles described in 2000